The spot-fin porcupinefish (Diodon hystrix), also known as the spotted porcupinefish, black-spotted porcupinefish or simply porcupinefish, is a member of the family Diodontidae.

Description
The spot-fin porcupinefish is a medium-sized fish which grows up to 91 cm, but the average size mostly observed is 40 cm.
Its body is elongated with a spherical head with big round protruding eyes, and a large mouth which is rarely closed. 
The pectoral fins are large, the pelvic fins are absent, and the anal and dorsal fins are close to the caudal peduncle. The latter move simultaneously during swimming.
The skin is smooth and firm; the scales are modified into spines.
The body coloration is beige to sandy-yellow marbled with dark blotches and dotted with numerous small black spots.

In case of danger, the porcupinefish can inflate itself by swallowing water to deter the potential predator with its larger volume and it can raise its spines.

The porcupinefish concentrates tetrodotoxin in certain parts of its body such as the liver, skin, gonads and the viscera. This defensive system constitutes an additional device to dissuade potential predators.

Distribution and habitat
The porcupinefish is circumglobal, found in tropical and subtropical waters. It has been recorded twice in the Mediterranean Sea, off southern Italy (1963) and the Balearic islands (2016).

Juveniles are pelagic up to the time that they are about 20 cm in length. Adults favour lagoons, top reefs and seaward coral or rocky reefs from one to 50 m depth, sheltering under ledges or in caves during the day.

Feeding
The porcupinefish's diet is based on sea urchins, gastropods, clams and crustaceans.

Behavior
This fish is solitary, except during mating periods, and it has a nocturnal activity with a maximal activity at sunset and sunrise.

Parasites

As with most fish, the porcupinefish is infected by a variety of parasites. Spectacular parasites are the cysts of the larvae of the trypanorhynch cestode Molicola horridus, often found in great numbers in the liver. These parasites represent no danger to humans.

References

External links
http://vintage-royalty-free-images.com/porcupine-fish-diodon-hystrix-p-505.html
http://www.marinespecies.org/aphia.php?p=taxdetails&id=127403
http://www.fishbase.org/summary/1022
http://eol.org/pages/1012692/details
http://doris.ffessm.fr/fiche2.asp?fiche_numero=2379
 

spot-fin porcupinefish
Pantropical fish
spot-fin porcupinefish
spot-fin porcupinefish